The Myeongin (Korean: 명인전, Hanja: 名人戰) is a Go competition in South Korea. The word myeongin in Korean language, literally meaning "Brilliant Man", is same as meijin in Japanese and as mingren in Chinese. The Myeongin is the Hanguk Kiwon equivalent to the Nihon-Kiin's Meijin title.  The tournament was defunct from 2004-2006.

The tournament was discontinued again in 2016 after the 43rd tournament, but was revived in 2021 with the SG Group as the new sponsor.

Outline
The Myeongin was formerly sponsored by the Kangwon Land Corporation.

In the 44th Myeongin, the winner's prize is 60,000,000 won and the runner-up's prize is 20,000,000 won. The format is double elimination. The sponsor is the SG Group, with the Hankook Ilbo newspaper and Korea Baduk Association as co-hosts.

Past winners and runners-up

See also
Meijin
Mingren

References

External links
 Sensei's Library
 Go to Everyone!
 Korea Baduk Association (in Korean)

Go competitions in South Korea